The Our Lady of the Assumption Church It is a Catholic church in Sainte-Marie, a town in Martinique, a dependency of France in the Lesser Antilles.

The church is located in the French department of Martinique, in the town of Sainte-Marie in la rue du Cimetière (Cemetery Street).

The Fort of Sainte-Marie was erected in honor of the Virgin Mary and gives its name to the parish of Sainte-Marie in 1658. On January 8, 1663, the Superior Council of the island ordered the formal establishment of the parishes of Sainte-Marie, the Grande Anse and Marigot administered by the Dominicans.

See also
Roman Catholicism in France
Our Lady of the Assumption Church (disambiguation)

References

Roman Catholic churches in Martinique
Roman Catholic churches completed in 1891
19th-century Roman Catholic church buildings in France